Dzikowiec  is a village in Kolbuszowa County, Subcarpathian Voivodeship, in south-eastern Poland. It is the seat of the gmina (administrative district) called Gmina Dzikowiec.

The village has a population of 1,400.

Until 20 December 1998 the village was named Stary Dzikowiec (Old Dzikowiec), next changed to Dzikowiec

Notable people
Marian Ciepielowski (1907–1973), physician and scientist

References

Dzikowiec